Forsterina is a genus of South Pacific intertidal spiders that was first described by Pekka T. Lehtinen in 1967.

Species
 it contains nine species:
Forsterina alticola (Berland, 1924) – New Caledonia
Forsterina annulipes (L. Koch, 1872) – Australia (Queensland, New South Wales, Lord Howe Is.)
Forsterina armigera (Simon, 1908) – Australia (Western Australia)
Forsterina cryphoeciformis (Simon, 1908) (type) – Australia (Western Australia)
Forsterina koghiana Gray, 1992 – New Caledonia
Forsterina segestrina (L. Koch, 1872) – Australia (New South Wales)
Forsterina velifera (Simon, 1908) – Australia (Western Australia)
Forsterina virgosa (Simon, 1908) – Australia (Western Australia)
Forsterina vultuosa (Simon, 1908) – Australia (Western Australia)

References

Araneomorphae genera
Desidae
Spiders of Australia
Spiders of Oceania
Taxa named by Pekka T. Lehtinen